Ally Mohamed Keissy (born 15 October 1949) is a Tanzanian CCM politician and Member of Parliament for Nkasi North constituency since 2010.

References

1949 births
Living people
Chama Cha Mapinduzi MPs
Tanzanian MPs 2010–2015